Australo- is a prefix and may refer to:

South
Australia

See also 
Austro (disambiguation)
Austral (disambiguation)